Quarter railway station served the village of Quarter, South Lanarkshire, Scotland, from 1863 to 1945 on the Hamilton and Strathaven Railway.

History 
The station was opened on 2 February 1863 by the Hamilton and Strathaven Railway. On the east side was the goods yard and at the south end was the signal box. There was a siding to the west  which served a quarry and a siding to the east, called Fairholm Siding, which served Fairholm Colliery. A new signal box opened to the north in 1907. The station closed on 1 October 1945.

References 

Disused railway stations in South Lanarkshire
Railway stations in Great Britain opened in 1863
Railway stations in Great Britain closed in 1945
1863 establishments in Scotland
1945 disestablishments in Scotland